Mihail Pherekyde (November 14, 1842 – January 24, 1926) was a Romanian politician and diplomat who served as the President of the Senate, President of the Assembly of Deputies, Minister of Foreign Affairs and two terms as the Minister of Internal Affairs of Kingdom of Romania.

Life and political career
Pherekyde attended St. Sava School and then the Lycée Louis-le-Grand in Paris. He graduated from the University of Sorbonne with a degree in Law. He was a member of newly formed Liberal Party of Romania established in 1875. On December 16, 1885 he took the post of the Minister of Foreign Affairs and was replaced by Petre P. Carp on March 21, 1888. He also served as Romanian envoy to France and played a role in acquisition of a building for Romanian Orthodox Church in Paris. Pherekyde was then appointed Minister of Internal Affairs on March 30, 1899 within Dimitrie Sturdza's government and served until March 31, 1899. He held the same office from December 15, 1909 until February 6, 1910.

See also
 Foreign relations of Romania

References

Romanian Ministers of Foreign Affairs
Members of the Chamber of Deputies (Romania)
Presidents of the Chamber of Deputies (Romania)
Members of the Senate of Romania
Presidents of the Senate of Romania
National Liberal Party (Romania) politicians
1842 births
1926 deaths
Romanian Ministers of Interior
Romanian Ministers of Justice
Romanian Ministers of Public Works
Lycée Louis-le-Grand alumni